Biosphere reserves of Ukraine are preservation territories of international importance that are part of the Nature-Preservation Fund of Ukraine.

Overview
The Ukrainian legislation has its own regulations about biosphere reserves which differs slightly from international. Nonetheless Ukraine recognizes the International designation for natural conservation as well. Thus in Ukraine exist two concepts biosphere reserve and biosphere preserves.

Biosphere preserves existed in the Soviet Union before establishment of the UNESCO's Man and the Biosphere Programme in 1971. Particularly in Ukraine, Carpathian Biosphere Reserve was created in 1968, but was admitted to the MAB programme only after fall of the Soviet Union in 1992.

Since 2012 there are eight biosphere reserves in Ukraine from the original three that the country inherited from the Soviet Union (Ukrainian SSR).

List

See also
 Man and the Biosphere Programme
 Primeval Beech Forests of Europe
 Categories of protected areas of Ukraine

References

External links

 List of all reserves in Ukraine. UNESCO website.

 
Biosphere reserves